Anworth Mortgage Asset Corporation was a mortgage real estate investment trust. In 2021, it was acquired by Ready Capital Corporation.

History
The company was formed in October 1997. On March 17, 1998, the company commenced operations and became a public company via an initial public offering.

In August 2007, the company's subsidiary, Belvedere Trust Mortgage Corporation, received a notice of default.

In March 2021, the company was acquired by Ready Capital Corporation.

References

1997 establishments in California
1998 initial public offerings
2021 mergers and acquisitions
Companies formerly listed on the New York Stock Exchange
Real estate companies established in 1997